Steven Allan Kivelson  (born May 13, 1954) is an American theoretical physicist known for several major contributions to condensed matter physics. He is currently the Prabhu Goel Family Professor at Stanford University. Before joining Stanford in 2004, he was a professor of physics at the University of California at Los Angeles. He is a son of Margaret Kivelson, and his father, Daniel Kivelson, was a professor of chemistry in UCLA.

Education and career
Kivelson received his Ph.D. from Harvard University in 1979, working with C. Daniel Gelatt, Jr. He spent three years as a postdoctoral researcher at the Institute for Theoretical Physics at the University of California, Santa Barbara, before joining the faculty of the State University of New York at Stony Brook, where he was an Assistant (1982–86), Associate (1986–88) and Full Professor (1988–89). In 1988, he moved to the University of California, Los Angeles. In 2004, Kivelson joined the faculty at Stanford University, where he was appointed Prabhu Goel Family Professor of Physics in 2012.

Awards and honors
He was awarded the Guggenheim fellowship in 1995 and was elected to the American Academy of Arts and Sciences in 2001, and to the National Academy of Sciences in 2010. In 2012, he was awarded the Bardeen prize (with Chandra Varma and James Sauls) instituted by the University of Illinois at Urbana–Champaign.

Research 
Kivelson is one of the leading figures in condensed matter physics and has made important contributions to many areas in quantum condensed matter physics. He is most famous for his widespread works in the field of strongly correlated systems and superconductivity, particularly high-temperature superconductivity, in which, among other things, he is known for proposing early microscopic mechanisms of cuprate high-Tc superconductivity and phase separation effects (with Victor Emery), and for introducing the paradigm of electronic liquid crystalline phases in these and other strongly correlated systems such as the quantum Hall systems (with Eduardo Fradkin and Victor Emery), and more recently for emphasizing the notion and significance of "intertwined orders" (with Eduardo Fradkin and John Tranquada) in these and other strongly correlated systems. He is also famous for early important works in quantum dimer models and resonating valence bond theory (with Daniel Rokhsar and others), for the first (bosonic) Chern-Simons field theory description of fractional quantum Hall effect and quantum Hall dualities (with Shoucheng Zhang, Hans Hansson, Dung-Hai Lee and others), and other important problems in fractional quantum Hall physics (with Jainendra K. Jain, Shivaji Sondhi and others). He has also made important contributions to the physics of polymers (with John Schrieffer, Alan J. Heeger and others), fullerenes (with Sudip Chakravarty and others), glasses and supercooled liquids (with Daniel Kivelson, Sudip Chakravarty, Zohar Nussinov and others), and, more recently, to in iron-based high-temperature superconductivity and problems involving nematicity, charge orders and superconductivity in general.

Kivelson is noted for his mentorship of students and postdoctoral researchers, several of whom have gone on to distinguished careers of their own.

References

External links 
 Stanford faculty webpage

1954 births
Living people
Harvard University alumni
University of California, Los Angeles alumni
Stanford University faculty
21st-century American physicists